Wedding Doll (or Hatuna MeNiyar) is a 2015 Israeli drama film directed by Nitzan Giladi. It was nominated for Best Film at the 2015 Ophir Awards.

Cast
Moran Rosenblatt as Hagit
Asi Levy as Sara
Roy Assaf as Omri
Aryeh Cherner as Aryeh
Itzik Giuli as David
Tomer Kapon as Chen

Reception
Wedding Doll scored 80% on Rotten Tomatoes, which was based on 25 reviews. The film was also ranked as "generally favorable", by 11 critics of Metacritic as well as 2.56 out of 5 stars from Glenn Kenny of RogerEbert.com. Sheri Linden of The Hollywood Reporter said that the film is "sensitively told, with a powerful sense of place".

References

External links

2015 drama films
2015 films
Israeli drama films
2010s Hebrew-language films